The Montenegrin Second League of Water Polo is the lower water polo league in Montenegro. It is organized by the Water Polo and Swimming Federation of Montenegro. League is playing during the summer months.

History 
Before Montenegrin independence, competition was known as a Montenegrin Republic Championship (3rd tier) or Montenegrin Amateur League. Since 2006, its name is Second Montenegrin League.

League is playing from July to August, and participants are mainly clubs from Bay of Kotor. Other clubs which played in the past were from Budva, Podgorica and Nikšić.

Champions 
Since 2006, five different clubs won the champion title of Montenegrin Second League. Most successful was VPK Bokelj from Baošići with six titles.

Sources:

See also
 Montenegrin First League of Water Polo
 Montenegrin Water Polo Cup

References

External links 
Water Polo and Swimming Federation of Montenegro

Second League